OV Helsingborg HK, is a handball team from Helsingborg, Sweden, which currently plays in Handbollsligan, the top level of Swedish men's handball. The club was founded in 1994 as a merger of Vikingarnas IF (founded in 1941) and HF Olympia (founded in 1963). Vikingarna have been Swedish champions three times (1961, 1967 and 1981). They last played in the top level in 1990. Olympia were less successful, but played two seasons in the top division from 1977 to 1979. OV Helsingborg reached the top division in 2007, 2009 and 2017 but were immediately relegated all three times. In 2019 and 2020 they played in the top division again for two seasons before they were relegated. In 2022 they will play the top division again.

Kits

Sports Hall information

Name: – Helsingborg Arena
City: – Helsingborg
Capacity: – 5000
Address: – Mellersta Stenbocksgatan 14, 254 37 Helsingborg, Sweden

References

External links
  
 

Sport in Helsingborg
Swedish handball clubs